The African Company of Merchants was managed by the African Committee, which was composed of nine committee members, three each from London, Liverpool and Bristol. The constitution stipulated that the committee should be elected annually from the general body of traders from these cities, who paid 40 shillings to be admitted to the company.

The establishing act, African Company Act 1750, had stipulated that committee members should be ineligible to remain on the committee after three years. However between 1750 and 1764 only 14 individuals served on the committee, with a palpable pattern of rotation.

1755
  Samuel Poirier

1757/58
 Samuel Touchet

1758/59
Elected 15 July 1758:  
 London: Rongat Lehook, Robert Scott, Henry Douglas
 Bristol: Samuel Smith, Vincent Briscoe, Pere Cuft
 Liverpool: Richard Gildart, Nathaniel Basnett, Charles Pole (MP)

1770/1771
 Richard Camplin

1772/3
The election took place on 3 July 1772.
London:
 John Bourke
 Gilbert Ross
 James Bogle French

1773/4
 John Bourke

1774/5
 John Bourke

1777/1778
 John Bourke
 John Barnes

1778/1779
 John Bourke

Dates to be determined
 John Shoolbred (1740-1802)

References

British slave traders
African Company of Merchants